Morridge is a geographical feature, a few mile east of Leek, in Staffordshire, England. It is in the local government district of Staffordshire Moorlands.

It is a long ridge of high moorland. The northern end, Morridge Top, is about a mile south of Flash. A few miles south at Merryton Low, near Upper Hulme, there is a trig point at height . The southern end of Morridge is at Onecote and Bradnop.

Morridge was pasture land in medieval times, and dairy and sheep farming still predominates. During the 16th and 17th centuries, Sir Edward Aston, his son Walter, 1st Lord Aston and his son Walter, 2nd Lord Aston attempted large-scale enclosure of Morridge. Local freeholders resisted this, and much of Morridge remained open. Full-scale enclosure first took place in 1769.

References

Hills of Staffordshire
Staffordshire Moorlands